Lee Hsin-han and Denys Molchanov were the defending champions but chose not to defend their title.

Mikhail Elgin and Alexander Kudryavtsev won the title after defeating Andrea Arnaboldi and Jonathan Eysseric 4–6, 6–1, [10–7] in the final.

Seeds

Draw

References
 Main Draw

China International Suzhou - Doubles